The Jama Masjid Shamsi is a major mosque built in historic center of Budaun, Uttar Pradesh, India.

The masjid was built by Iltutmish, the ruler of Delhi Sultanate that time. This masjid reflects Persian and Afghan architecture. It has three gates: the main gate, facing Shakeel Road, is made up of red marble and stands 100 feet tall. The second gate is in Farshori Tola and the third one in Sotha. It has a central dome surrounded by two more domes, and 5 other domes too. The floor is made from white marble (SangeMarMar). It has a "Hauz"(pond) and three "WuzuKhana"(Washroom and sitting Room) on its premises. Two sides of mosque are occupied by residential blocks: the Jama Masjid Quarters.

The mosque is built on an elevated area called Sotha Mohalla, and can be called the highest structure in the town of Budaun.

This masjid is the third oldest existing and seventh largest mosque of the country after Delhi's Jama Masjid, having a standard capacity of 23500. The built up part of the mosque is larger than any other mosque of the country. Before the expansion of Delhi's Jama Masjid, it was the largest and most famous mosque of the country. The central dome of the mosque is considered to be the largest for any dome of mosque in the country.

It is also a Monument of National Importance and a National Heritage Site.

In October 2022 Hindu organzations claimed the site as one where a Hindu temple served as a foundation for the mosque. Their desire is to demolish the mosque and reclaim the site as a Hindu temple.

References

Mosques in Uttar Pradesh
1223 establishments in Asia
13th-century establishments in India
Mosques completed in 1223
Budaun
Budaun
Architecture of the Mamluk dynasty (Delhi)